Casuarina obesa, commonly known as swamp she-oak or swamp oak, is a species of Casuarina that is closely related to C. glauca and C. cristata. The Noongar peoples know the plant as Goolee, Kweela, Kwerl and Quilinock.

Distribution
It is native to a broad area of south-western Australia, with a much more restricted occurrence in New South Wales and Victoria.

Description
It has male and female flowers on separate plants, the female plants produce woody cones in an indehiscent state, with crops from two seasons sometimes present. These produce approximately 370 seeds per gram.
It is found in sand or clay soils, often in brackish or saline environments, along rivers, creeks and salt lakes.

Usage
It is widely planted for agroforestry, particularly in salt-affected areas, and as a street tree.

Gallery

References

Sources
 

obesa
Fagales of Australia
Flora of New South Wales
Flora of Victoria (Australia)
Flora of Western Australia
Trees of Australia
Dioecious plants